tRNA pseudouridine32 synthase (RluA, pseudouridine synthase RluA, Pus9p, Rib2/Pus8p) is an enzyme with systematic name tRNA-uridine32 uracil mutase. This enzyme catalyses the following chemical reaction

 tRNA uridine32  tRNA pseudouridine32

The dual enzyme from Escherichia coli also catalyses the formation of pseudouridine746 in 23S rRNA.

References

External links 
 

EC 5.4.99